Albert Campbell Collegiate Institute (Albert Campbell CI, ACCI or Campbell), initially intended to be known as Sir William Osler Collegiate Institute is a public high school in Toronto, Ontario, Canada. It is located in the former suburb of Scarborough. The school was opened in 1976 by the Scarborough Board of Education.

The school has a full range of programs and extra-curricular activities to provide all students with the Albert Campbell Experience:  Academics, Community and Engagement. It is named after former Scarborough politician and mayor Albert McTaggart Campbell.

History
In its conception, the school was originally to be named Sir William Osler Collegiate Institute, but it was changed to Albert Campbell, the former mayor of Scarborough, resulting in the name Albert Campbell Collegiate Institute. Another school was built which eventually gave the name Sir William Osler High School.

The school, at the cost of $5,658,304.00, was constructed in 1975 and opened its doors on September 7, 1976, as its seventeenth collegiate in the former City of Scarborough. The building was designed by Japanese Canadian architect Raymond Moriyama, who built Ontario buildings such as the Ontario Science Centre, Toronto Reference Library and the North York Central Library. Renovations were completed in the late 1980s and additions added in the early 1990s. When others schools were being built, Albert Campbell served as a temporary school for other regions.

Overview

Campus

Albert Campbell is built with 251,024 sq ft of space on 16 acres of land making it the second-largest High School in Scarborough (the largest is Cedarbrae Collegiate Institute). As an open-concept two-storey school, it features over 80 classrooms, ten science labs, three music rooms (with keyboard lab), black box drama room, four art rooms, two dark rooms (one for tech one for art), ten computer labs, six tech rooms (auto shop, construction, communication, computer, technological design and green industries), large forum, a cafetorium with the stage, four gymnasiums and an activity gym, with the larger one can be portioned into two gymnasiums, a 25m swimming pool, a weight room located above gym four, main and guidance offices located in the forum (guidance and main office are separated) and the 400m race track and football/soccer field as well as baseball diamond at the back and side of the school. The school is also equipped with 12 fire exits.

Notable alumni

 Andrea Constand - Former director of operations of Temple University women's basketball team
 Sunny Fong - Canadian designer, Winner of Project Runway Canada Season 2
 Cherie Piper - Member of the Canada women's national ice hockey team, gold medalist in 2002, 2006, and 2010 Olympics.
 Mark Taylor - Canadian actor Instant Star, Flashpoint
Genelle Williams - Canadian actor Warehouse 13, Bitten (TV series), Bitten (TV series)

See also

 List of high schools in Ontario

References

External links
 Albert Campbell at TDSB
 School board website

High schools in Toronto
Schools in the TDSB
Raymond Moriyama buildings
Buildings and structures completed in 1976
Education in Scarborough, Toronto
Educational institutions established in 1976
1976 establishments in Ontario